Bruised Orange is the fifth album by American folk singer and songwriter John Prine, released in 1978.

Recording
After the tepid reviews for his 1975 album Common Sense, Prine was disillusioned with his label, Atlantic Records, who he felt had not promoted the LP as much as they could have. 
Prine remained deeply respected within the industry, and even appeared on the new hit show Saturday Night Live as a substitute for the Beach Boys in 1976, performing "Hello in There" and "The Bottomless Lake" (Prine fan and fellow Chicago native John Belushi had lobbied for the singer). Prine signed with the singer-songwriter friendly Asylum Records for a three-album deal in 1977 and turned to his friend and fellow Chicago songwriter Steve Goodman to produce Bruised Orange, which was recorded and mixed at the Chicago Recording Company between January and March 1978.  Prine had done work on the new album with Jack Clement but, as he explained to Paul Zollo of Bluerailroad magazine, "I had made the record already but I didn’t have it. I worked with Cowboy Jack Clement, who was a huge mentor to me and the reason why I moved to Nashville.  I moved there and we worked for three to four months, solid. And through all kinds of outside forces and things that shouldn’t have been going on in the studio, we didn’t get the record that we were playing every day.  We really enjoyed making the record, but we didn’t get it on tape the way we were hearing it in the studio."  Frustrated, Prine went to Los Angeles and spoke with several "big-time producers" but admitted to Zollo that had lost his enthusiasm for the project:  "I talked to, Christ, twenty different producers, really great guys, great producers. Big-time producers. And I just didn’t want to do it. I just didn’t have the heart to do the record again.  And Goodman said he would do it."  The album features "If You Don't Want My Love" which Prine co-wrote with Phil Spector.

Composition
In the Great Days: The John Prine Anthology liner notes, Prine claims that the inspiration for "That's The Way The World Goes Round" came from him being "kind of fed up with a lot of cynicism that I saw in people, even in myself at the time. I wanted to find a way to get back to a better world, more childlike. I immediately went back and started writing from a child's perspective."  Prine was introduced to Phil Spector by L.A. Times writer Robert Hillburn and wrote "If You Don't Want My Love" with the producer at his house, recalling to Bluebirdrailroad magazine, "It happened on the way out the door.  We’d been there for seven hours, jokin’, drinkin’.  And by the way, when you go in the house, he's got two bodyguards on his shoulder.  It was just craziness, you know...So I was leaving around four in the morning, and all of a sudden Phil sits down at the piano as I was getting my jacket on, and he hands me an electric guitar unplugged.  And I sit down on the bench next to him.  I played him 'That's The Way The World Goes Round', and he really liked it.  He said, 'Let's do this,' and he played the beginning notes of 'If You Don't Want My Love'.  And we came up with the first couple lines and he insisted that we repeat them.  Over and over.  He said it would be very effective. And we took 'That's The Way The World Goes Round' and took the melody and turned it inside out...And that was on my way out the door.  And as soon as he sat down and had a musical instrument, he was normal.  That's the way he was.  He was just a plain old genius."

For the sleeve to his 1988 album John Prine Live, the singer wrote that he composed the album's opening track "Fish And Whistle" about a carwash down the street from his house because "I hadn't wrote a song in what seemed like years so one day I decided just to write a song about what was goin' on around me."
The title song was inspired by a real life tragedy, as Prine later explained to Paul Zollo in 2009:  "I liked the title, and the image, and I wanted to do something with that image without saying anything about an orange or a bruise in the song.  It was based upon something that actually happened.  I was an altar boy, and the Northwestern train tracks were not far from the church that I went to. I was going down there one day and there was this big ruckus going on at the train tracks. I had to go shovel the snow off the church steps before Mass. Because they’d sue the church if people fell and broke their legs.  So I was going down there to get the snow and ice off.  I went over to the train tracks. A kid who had also been an altar boy at the Catholic Church, I found out later, was walking down the train tracks. And evidently the commuter train came up behind him. They were taking him away in bushel baskets, there was nothing left of him. There were a bunch of mothers standing around, trying to figure out – cause it was Sunday morning and all their kids were gone and they didn’t know – they all hadn’t located their children yet, and they didn’t know who it was." 
 
Prine also resurrected “Aw Heck,” written in West Germany more than a decade before, while “There She Goes” also contained a jaunty country sound that Merle Travis could have written, with lyrics that sounded like they reflected Prine's own crumbling marriage.  Prine has often stated that he believes "Sabu Visits The Twin Cities Alone"  is the oddest song he ever penned.   It tells the story of Indian actor Sabu who starred in the 1937 film "The Elephant Boy" and the culture shock he experiences on a promotional tour of shopping malls in the American Midwest in the middle of winter.  In the liner notes to John Prine Live the singer marvels, "What a strange song.  Who would want to write a song like this?"  The album closer, "The Hobo Song," features an array of background vocalists, including Jackson Browne and Ramblin' Jack Elliott.

Reception

Bruised Orange is regarded as one of Prine's strongest collection of songs and received generally positive reviews when it was released.  Writing in Rolling Stone in 1978, Jay Cocks proclaimed that "Steve Goodman is likely the best and certainly the most congenial producer Prine has ever had" and added "No matter when you play it, Bruised Orange carries the chill of Midwest autumn beyond autobiography...into a kind of personal pop mythology."

Village Voice critic Robert Christgau was cool towards the album in The Village Voice, writing that "...Prine sounds like he's singing us bedtime stories, and while the gently humorous mood is attractive, at times it makes this 'crooked piece of time that we live in' seem as harmless and corny as producer Steve Goodman's background moves...", although he ultimately found Prine's "meaningful nonsense" comparable to and more impressive than Edward Lear's poetry.

In 1993, critic David Fricke wrote in the Great Days anthology liner notes that Bruised Orange is "very much an album about the light at the end of the hurt" and observed that the LP was "the highest form of praise Goodman could have given, a marvel of taut, confessional Prinespeak rendered with a seductive pop-folk intimacy and, on droll boppers like 'Fish And Whistle', a deceptive, whimsical bounce."  Writing for Allmusic, critic William Ruhlman wrote of the album "Despite some brilliant songs, Prine's followup albums to his stunning debut were uneven until this" and stated that "Sabu Visits the Twin Cities Alone" was "perhaps the best depiction ever written of life on the road in the entertainment business."  Prine himself remembers the album fondly for Goodman's saving influence, commenting to Bluerailroad, "I totally put it in his hands.  And he handed me back a beautiful record."  Prine biographer Eddie Huffman calls the album "a spare, acoustic-driven pop-folk rock record that occasionally veered uncomfortably close to Jimmy Buffett-style whimsy, but generally stayed on track."

Track listing 
All tracks composed by John Prine, except where indicated.
 "Fish and Whistle" – 3:14
 "There She Goes" – 3:24
 "If You Don't Want My Love" (Prine, Phil Spector) – 3:05
 "That's the Way That the World Goes 'Round" – 3:20
 "Bruised Orange (Chain of Sorrow)" – 5:21
 "Sabu Visits the Twin Cities Alone" – 2:53
 "Aw Heck" – 2:20
 "Crooked Piece of Time" – 2:52
 "Iron Ore Betty" – 2:42
 "The Hobo Song" – 3:31

Personnel 
 John Prine – vocals, backing vocals, guitar
 Jethro Burns – mandolin
 John Burns – guitar, backing vocals
 Sam Bush – guitar, backing vocals
 Bob Hoban – piano
 Bob Horne – keyboards, backing vocals
 Leo LeBlanc – dobro, guitar, pedal steel guitar
 Howard Levy – piano, accordion, keyboards, saxophone
 Steve Goodman – guitar, backing vocals, harmony vocals
 Tom Radtke – drums, percussion
 Steve Rodby – bass
 Jim Rothermel – clarinet, saxophone, recorder, penny whistle
 Corky Siegel – harmonica, piano
 Mike Utley – organ, piano
 Don Shelton – backing vocals
 Diane Holmes – backing vocals
 Len Dresslar – backing vocals
 Ramblin' Jack Elliott – backing vocals
 Bob Bowker – backing vocals
 Jackson Browne – backing vocals
 John Cowan — backing vocals
 Kitty Haywood – backing vocals
 Bonnie Herman – backing vocals
 Vicki Hubley – backing vocals
 Bonnie Koloc – backing vocals

Chart positions

References

Bibliography

1978 albums
John Prine albums
Atlantic Records albums